Mölndal is the seat and administrative centre of Mölndal Municipality, located just south of Gothenburg on the west-coast of Sweden. About 40,000 of the municipality's 60,000 inhabitants live in Mölndal proper.

Geography
Mölndal is located on the western main line railway between Gothenburg and Malmö and the European highways E6/E20 run through the area from north to south. Mölndal is served by the Gothenburg tramway system.

History

The name of the city derives from two words; Möln, which is a short form for Möllor, an old word for mills, and the word dal, which is the Swedish word for valley. Mölndal is the "Valley of mills". The narrow but high and long waterfalls in Kvarnbyn gave the necessary power to all the watermills that together with the windmills on the hills gave birth to the early industrialisation of Mölndal.

Industry

Mölndal is best known for its high concentration of companies in life sciences. AstraZeneca has one of its global research centres here with more than 3,100 employees. Several other companies in areas of research such as pharmaceuticals, biomedicine, and biotechnology are also located here. The proximity to the University of Gothenburg and to Chalmers University of Technology - with their technology parks - has supported development of other sectors, such as microwave technology and information technology. Two national research institutes, IFP SICOMP AB and IVF Industrial Research and Development Corporation, are also located in Mölndal.

Sports
The following sports clubs are located in Mölndal:
 Fässbergs IF
 Balltorps FF
 IF Mölndal Hockey
 Jitex BK
 Dalen/Krokslätts FF
 Kvarnby Basket

The town is also home to the Hills Golf Club.

European Cooperation
 Mölndal is a member city of Eurotowns network

Notable people

Oscar Dronjak, guitarist and founder of the Swedish heavy metal band HammerFall
Anders Frisk, football (soccer) referee
Björn Goop, horse driver and trainer (trotting)
Erica Johansson, long jumper
Anna Kjellbin, ice hockey player
Mats Levén, metal singer
Claes Malmberg, actor and stand-up comedian
Annelie Pompe, world record holder in variable weights freediving
Ulla Jacobsson, actor
Per Andersson (actor), comedian

See also
ERL (automobile manufacturer)

References

Municipal seats of Västra Götaland County
Swedish municipal seats
Populated places in Västra Götaland County
Populated places in Mölndal Municipality
Metropolitan Gothenburg
Gothenburg and Bohus